Sky Fort Business Center is a skyscraper office building currently under construction in Sofia. Located at the busiest thoroughfare in the Bulgarian capital, Tsarigradsko shose, and nearby Tsarigradsko shose Metro Station. Sky Fort will be the first skyscraper over 200 m tall in Sofia and will become the tallest building in Bulgaria and in the Balkans (with the exception of Istanbul).

The building will have 2 underground floors which will serve as parking spaces. The building is planned to be finished in 2023.

In addition to the 36 office floors, the skyscraper will have a cafe on the ground floor, 3 technical floors and a restaurant on two levels at the top of the building, where there will also be a panoramic observation deck. A panoramic elevator will be used between the restaurant at the top and the observation deck. The building will have a total of 19 elevators, of which 4 will connect the ground floor and underground floors, 13 high-speed elevators will serve the office floors. There will also be one cargo and one more to be used in emergency rescue operations.

See also
List of tallest buildings in Sofia
List of tallest buildings in Bulgaria
List of tallest structures in Bulgaria
List of tallest buildings in Europe
List of tallest buildings in the European Union
Capital Fort

References

Buildings and structures in Sofia
Proposed skyscrapers